Vijay Antony (born 24 July 1975) is an Indian music composer, playback singer, actor, film editor, lyricist, audio engineer, and filmmaker working predominantly in Tamil cinema. He made his debut as music composer in 2005. He is the first Indian Music Director to win the 2009 Cannes Golden Lion for the song Naaka Mukka advertising film in the Best Music category. The song was played at the 2011 Cricket World Cup. He made his debut film Naan in 2012. He is best known for his roles in action thriller films such as Salim (2014) 
and Pichaikkaran (2016).

Early life  

Vijay Antony was born in Nagercoil, Kanyakumari District.

Career

Vijay Antony made his acting debut in the lead role in the crime thriller Naan. The film's standalone sequel titled Salim, an action thriller, was his next venture as an actor and music director. Both the films were sleeper hits. In 2015, he starred in the romantic comedy India Pakistan but did not compose the music. In 2016, he acted in the action thriller Pichaikkaran (2016), collaborating with his Dishyum director Sasi. It became a commercial success,  
with overall collections nearing 40 Crore. The Telugu dub Bichagadu was a bigger success than the original. His next was Saithan, an action thriller directed by debutant Pradeep Krishnamurthy.

He appeared in the 2017 political action thriller Yaman directed by Jeeva Shankar. Produced by A. Subaskaran under the banner Lyca Productions & Vijay Antony Film Corporation, it starred Miya and Thiagarajan. The film was released on 24 February 2017. His next film was the action drama Annadurai, the story of two brothers of contrasting characters who live their life as fate plays a big part in their personalities. In 2018, he starred in Kaali, a period action film directed by Kiruthiga Udhayanidhi and Thimiru Pudichavan, an action film directed by Ganeshaa.

In 2019, he starred in Kolaigaran, an action thriller directed by Andrew Louis and featuring Arjun Sarja.

Filmography

Actor

Editor

Discography

Music director

Singer

Television

 2002 Chinna Papa Periya Papa (Season 1) (Credited as Agni) (Sun TV)
 2005 Malargal (Sun TV)
 2005 Kettimelam (Jaya TV)
 2006 Kana Kaanum Kaalangal (Vijay TV)
 2007 Kadhalikka Neramillai (Vijay TV)
 2007 Megala (Sun TV)
 2015 Chinna Papa Periya Papa (Season 2) (Sun TV)

Award

Antony is the first Indian to win a Cannes Golden Lion; he won in 2009 for the "Nakka Mukka" commercial (for The Times of India) in the Best of Music category. The song raised his fame and was played at the 2011 Cricket World Cup.

References

External links

 
 [ Vijay Antony] at Allmusic
 

Living people
Tamil playback singers
Musicians from Tamil Nadu
Indian male playback singers
People from Nagercoil
People from Kanyakumari district
Indian male film actors
Male actors in Tamil cinema
Tamil film producers
Film producers from Tamil Nadu
1975 births
Tamil film score composers